Thomas Howard Fraleigh (June 28, 1877 – January 29, 1946) was an Ontario farmer and political figure. He represented Lambton East in the Legislative Assembly of Ontario from 1929 to 1934 as a Conservative member.

He was born in St. Marys, Ontario, the son of Sidney Fraleigh, and was educated there. In 1902, he married Winnifred Anderson. He belonged to the local Masonic lodge. Fraleigh grew flax and hemp near Forest, Ontario. Fraleigh also pioneered techniques to make more efficient use of pasture land when raising of livestock. Fraleigh coordinated Canadian flax production in World War I: flax was shipped to Ireland to produce linen for use in the manufacture of airplane wings. Fraleigh also experimented with the production of hemp for use in manufacturing fibres. The cultivation of hemp  was later banned in Canada because of its association with cannabis. He died at his home in Forest, Ontario, on January 29, 1946.

References 

 Canadian Parliamentary Guide, 1930, AL Normandin

External links 

Lambton County's Hundred Years, 1849 - 1949, V Lauriston (1949)

1877 births
1946 deaths
Progressive Conservative Party of Ontario MPPs